is one of the three royal mausoleums of the Ryukyu Kingdom, along with Urasoe yōdore at Urasoe Castle and Izena Tamaudun near Izena Castle in Izena, Okinawa. The mausoleum is located in Shuri, Okinawa, and was built for Ryūkyūan royalty in 1501 by King Shō Shin, the third king of the Second Shō Dynasty a short distance from Shuri Castle.

Overview
The site, covering an area of 2,442m², consists of two stone-walled enclosures, the three compartments of the mausoleum itself facing north and backed by a natural cliff to the south. A stone stele in the outer enclosure memorializes the construction of the mausoleum, which was finished in 1501, and lists the name of Shō Shin along with those of eight others involved in the construction. The shisa (stone lions) guarding the tomb are examples of traditional Ryūkyūan stone sculpture. The architectural style of the mausoleum represents that of the royal palace at the time, which was a stone structure with a wooden roof.

The structure suffered extensive damage in the 1945 battle of Okinawa, and was subsequently looted, but the tombs and royal remains themselves remained intact, and much of the structure has since been restored. In 1992 Hiroshi Shō, the great-grandson of Shō Tai, the last king of the Ryūkyū Kingdom, donated Tamaudun and the royal gardens of Shikina-en to the City of Naha. It was designated a World Heritage Site by UNESCO on December 2, 2000, as a part of the site group Gusuku Sites and Related Properties of the Kingdom of Ryukyu and a National Treasure in 2018.

Burials
Seventeen of the 19 kings of the Second Shō Dynasty who ruled between 1470 and 1879 are entombed at Tamaudun, along with various queens and royal children. The first person to be buried there was Shō En, for whom the mausoleum was constructed upon the orders of his son and successor, Shō Shin. However, for approximately 25 years, Shō En was not initially interred here, given that he died in 1476 and the mausoleum was not completed until 1501. Other monarchs not interred here include Shō Sen'i (1430-1477), who was not later re-interred here as his brother was, and Shō Nei (1564–1620) who chose to be interred separately in Urasoe yōdore in the aftermath of the Invasion of Ryukyu. The last interree was former Prince of Nakagusuku, Shō Ten, the son of the Ryūkyū Kingdom's last king, Shō Tai, who was entombed there in 1920 in accordance with traditional Ryūkyūan royal funerary rites.

Eastern Chamber (37 sarcophagi, 40 corpses)
No. 1:  Shō En (1415–1476)
No. 2:  Shō Shin (1465–1526) &  Shō Sei (1497–1555)
No. 3:  Shō Gen (1528–1572)
No. 4: , Queen consort of Shō Gen
No. 5:  Shō Ei (1559–1588) &  
No. 6: , Queen consort of Shō Ei 
No. 7:  Shō Hō (1590–1640)
No. 8: , Queen consort of Shō Hō; & Shō Kyō (1612–1631), Crown Prince, eldest son of Shō Hō 
No. 9: (unknown)
No. 10: , Queen consort of Shō Hō 
No. 11:  Shō Ken (1625–1647)
No. 12: , Queen consort of Shō Ken 
No. 13:  Shō Shitsu (1629–1668)
No. 14: , Queen consort of Shō Shitsu 
No. 15:  Shō Tei (1645–1709)
No. 16: , Queen consort of Shō Tei 
No. 17: Shō Jun (1660–1706), Crown Prince, eldest son of Shō Tei
No. 18: , Crown Princess of Shō Jun 
No. 19:  Shō Eki (1678–1712)
No. 20: , Queen consort of Shō Eki 
No. 21:  Shō Kei (1700–1751)
No. 22: , Queen consort of Shō Kei 
No. 23:  Shō Boku (1739–1794)
No. 24: , Queen consort of Shō Boku 
No. 25: Shō Tetsu (1759–1788), Crown Prince, eldest son of Shō Boku
No. 26: , Queen consort of Shō Tetsu 
No. 27:  Shō On (1784–1802)
No. 28: , Queen consort of Shō On 
No. 29:  Shō Sei (1800–1803)
No. 30:  Shō Kō (1787–1834)
No. 31: , Queen consort of Shō Kō
No. 32:  Shō Iku (1813–1847)
No. 33: , Queen consort of Shō Iku
No. 34:  Shō Tai (1843–1901)
No. 35: , Queen consort of Shō Tai
No. 36: Shō Ten (1864-1920), Crown Prince, eldest son of Shō Tai
No. 37: , Crown Princess, wife of Shō Ten

Central Chamber (1 sarcophagus, 1 corpse)
No. 1 (unknown)
Western Chamber (32 sarcophagi, 32 corpses)
No. 1: (unknown)
No 2: , eldest daughter of Shō En, 1st Kikoe-ōgimi
No. 3: , eldest son of Shō Shin; & , eldest daughter of Shō Ikō, 2nd Kikoe-ōgimi
No. 4: , third son of Shō Shin
No. 5: , eldest daughter of Shō Gen
No. 6: , wife of Shō Gen
No. 7: , wife of Shō Gen
No. 8–9: (unknown)
No. 10: , second daughter of Shō Ei, 4th Kikoe-ōgimi
No. 11–13: (unknown) 
No. 14: , wife of Shō Hō
No. 15: , Crown Princess, wife of Shō Kyō
No. 16: , Crown Princess, wife of 
No. 17–20: (unknown) 
No. 21: Shō Kyū (1560–1620), third son of Shō Gen
No. 22: , second son of Shō Kō
No. 23: , fourth son of Shō Kō
No. 24: , seventh son of Shō Kō
No. 25: , eldest son of Shō Iku
No. 26–31: (unknown) 
No. 32: , fifth daughter of Shō Tai; & , sixth daughter of Shō Tai

Gallery

See also
 List of Historic Sites of Japan (Okinawa)
 List of Important Cultural Properties of Japan (Okinawa: structures)

References

External links

UNESCO World Heritage Site Listing - Official Site
(Japanese) 沖縄の世界遺産玉陵 (Tamaudun, World Heritage Site of Okinawa)

Ryukyu Kingdom
World Heritage Sites in Japan
Mausoleums in Japan
Buildings and structures completed in 1501
Buildings and structures in Japan destroyed during World War II
Historic Sites of Japan
1501 establishments in Asia
National Treasures of Japan